Bilozerka Raion was one of the 18 former administrative raions (districts) of Kherson Oblast in southern Ukraine. Its administrative center was located in the urban-type settlement of Bilozerka. The raion was disestablished on 18 July 2020 as part of the administrative reform of Ukraine, which reduced the number of raions of Kherson Oblast to five. The area of the former Bilozerka Raion was merged into Kherson Raion. The last estimate of the raion population was 

At the time of disestablishment, the raion consisted of five hromadas:
 Bilozerka settlement hromada with the administration in Bilozerka;
 Chornobaivka rural hromada with the administration in the selo of Chornobaivka;
 Darivka rural hromada with the administration in the selo of Darivka;
 Muzykivka rural hromada with the administration in the selo of Muzykivka;
 Stanislav rural hromada with the administration in the selo of Stanislav.

Settlements 
Settlements in the raion include:

 Zelenyi Hai

References

Former raions of Kherson Oblast
1939 establishments in the Soviet Union
Ukrainian raions abolished during the 2020 administrative reform